Richard Fielder may refer to:

 Richard Fielder (cricketer) (1758–1826), English cricketer
 Richard Fielder (writer) (1925–2020), American screenwriter